Charles Edward Kingsley Newman  (1900–1989) was a British physician and medical school dean.

Biography
After education at Mill Mead School in Shrewsbury and then at Shrewsbury School, Newman spent the summer of 1918 in the Oxford University Officers' Training Corps. In 1919 he was demobilised and matriculated at Magdalene College, Cambridge, where he graduated BA (Cantab.) in 1921. He studied medicine at King's College Hospital Medical School, where he qualified MRCS, LRCP in 1923 and graduated MB BCh in 1924. In 1926 he won the RCP's Murchison Scholarship and qualified MRCP. He graduated MD in 1927. He held various house appointments at the Belgrave Hospital for Children and at King's College Hospital, where he was for two years a Sambrooke medical registrar. He spent six months at the University of Freiburg as a volunteer assistant to Ludwig Aschoff. At King's College Hospital, Newman was appointed junior physician, morbid anatomist, medical tutor, and vice-dean. There he was promoted to full physician in 1938 and offered the deanship of the King's College Hospital Medical School, but he resigned to become a sub-dean at Hammersmith's Royal Postgraduate Medical School.

When Sir Charles Dodds became president of the Royal College of Physicians in 1962, Newman succeeded him as Harveian Librarian, holding that office for seventeen years. He was awarded the RCP's Linacre Fellowship in 1966.

Newman married his first wife in 1952, who died in 1965. In 1971 he married his second wife, who died in 1982. Upon his death in 1989 he was survived by several stepchildren from his second marriage.

Awards and honours
 1932 — FRCP
 1933 — Goulstonian Lecturer
 1954–1955 — Fitzpatrick Lecturer
 1965 – CBE
 1968 – Fitzpatrick Lecturer
 1973 — Harveian Orator

Selected publications
 
 with L. M. Payne: 
 
 with L. M. Payne:

References

1900 births
1989 deaths
20th-century English medical doctors
People educated at Shrewsbury School
Alumni of Magdalene College, Cambridge
Fellows of the Royal College of Physicians
Commanders of the Order of the British Empire
Presidents of the Osler Club of London